Graphium euphrates is a butterfly found in the Philippines and Sulawesi that belongs to the swallowtail family.

The larva feeds on Annona, Desmos and Uvaria species.

Subspecies
G. e. euphrates (Philippines: Busuanga, Cuyo, Homonhon, Leyte, Luzon, Marinduque, Mindanao, Mindoro, Samar)
G. e. nisus Jordan (northern Luzon)
G. e. domaranus (Fruhstorfer, 1903) (Philippines: Palawan, Dumaran, Balabac) 
G. e. ornatus (Rothschild, 1895) (Halmahera, Ternate, Bachan)
G. e. boholensis Page, 1987 (Philippines: Bohol)
G. e. buhisanus Page, 1987 (Philippines: Cebu)
G. e. elegantia Tsukada & Nishiyama, 1980 (southern Sulawesi)

References

Page & Treadaway, 2003 Schmetterlinge der Erde, Butterflies of the world Part XVII (17), Papilionidae IX Papilionidae of the Philippine Islands. Edited by Erich Bauer and Thomas Frankenbach Keltern: Goecke & Evers; Canterbury: Hillside Books. 

euphrates
Butterflies described in 1862